Wheatus are an American rock band from Northport, New York, formed in 1995. They are known principally for their 2000 single "Teenage Dirtbag", which appeared in the films Loser and Bully; the HBO miniseries Generation Kill; the Netflix original series Girlboss and The Chilling Adventures of Sabrina; and the Hulu original miniseries The Girl from Plainville.

Origins
Brendan B. Brown, commonly known as BBB to fans, is the lead vocalist, guitarist, and the only remaining founding member of Wheatus, which he formed in 1995 with his brother, Peter Brown (drums) and Rich Liegey (bass).  Brown has also collaborated with James Bourne of Busted and McBusted (a collaboration between Busted and McFly) on several songs for McBusted's album, McBusted.

History

1995–2002: Formation and Wheatus
Wheatus was formed by Brendan B. Brown in 1995, on the lower east side of New York City. Brown began by writing a few songs, and subsequently enlisted the help of his brother Peter Brown on drums, Rich Liegey on bass and backing vocals and Philip A. Jimenez on various percussion instruments, keyboards, harmonica, providing samples and special effects. The band derives its name from the nickname "wedus" given to the Brown brothers by their father when they were children. Then, in 1999 they hired New York entertainment attorney Ray Maiello who booked them at the Luna Lounge on New York's Lower East Side for regular appearances. Maiello helped the group and shopped their self-produced debut album to major record labels.  Maiello sent demos to A&R executive Kevin Patrick from Columbia Records.  Maiello then arranged for Patrick to see a packed showcase at Mercury Lounge and Patrick quickly signed the band to a multi-album deal. Maiello was subsequently hired as the band's manager. Their self-titled debut album was released on August 15, 2000 and spawned the band's first and largest hit, "Teenage Dirtbag", a song which charted at No. 1 in Australia and No. 2 in the United Kingdom. Their second single, a cover of one of Erasure's signature songs – "A Little Respect", also reached very high chart positions, peaking at No. 3 on the UK Singles Chart. The third single from the album, a double A-side of "Leroy" and "Wannabe Gangstar", didn't perform as well as expected, only reaching No. 23 in the UK Singles Chart. Another song from the album, "Punk Ass Bitch", was bought by the creators of Jackie Chan Adventures and reworked as "Chan's the Man", the end credits theme for the program's first season.

2002–2005: Hand Over Your Loved Ones and Suck Fony
The band began work on their second album in the summer of 2002, with Brendan enlisting the help of his sister, Liz Brown, and the band's merchandiser, Kathryn Froggatt, as backing vocalists. Shannon Harris of Relish, a band who had previously supported Wheatus on their earlier tours, was also added to the band as keyboardist. The album's first single, "American in Amsterdam", was heavily underpromoted after the band had a dispute with their record label over their request to lip sync on Top of the Pops. When their second studio album, Hand Over Your Loved Ones, was released in Autumn 2003, it received little or no promotion in the United Kingdom, and was never released in the United States due to the ongoing dispute. In October 2004, the band made the decision to part with their record label, and as such, formed their own record label, Montauk Mantis. During this time, they also enlisted Michael Bellar as a replacement for Shannon Harris, who had decided to leave the band over the dispute. In February 2005, the band re-released Hand Over Your Loved Ones under the new title Suck Fony. For the re-release, the album included new songs, including the new track "William McGovern", and a cover of the Pat Benatar classic "Hit Me with Your Best Shot". The album was originally only made available via the band's website, until 2007, when it was added to iTunes and Amazon MP3 after the band signed a distribution contract.

2005–2007: Line-up changes and Too Soon Monsoon
Bassist Mike McCabe left the band in March 2005, shortly after the release of Suck Fony. He was subsequently replaced by Nicolas diPierro. The band subsequently began recording a new album in April 2005, and just three months later, the album's first single, BMX Bandits, was released as a limited edition 7" single. In October 2005, the band's third studio album, Too Soon Monsoon, was released via their official website. Since early 2010, Too Soon Monsoon has been made available via a "pay what you want" donation scheme via the band's official website. Days after the release, Michael Bellar decided to leave the band, and was replaced by Gerard Hoffmann. A second single from the album, The London Sun, was released in February 2006, however, the release marked the departure of Nicolas diPierro, who was subsequently replaced by 19-year-old rookie bassist Matt Milligan. A further line-up changed occurred in May 2006 when drummer Pete Brown decided to give up being a musician to get married. He was subsequently replaced by Kevin Garcia, leaving Brendan Brown as the only remaining member from the original line-up. The next line-up change occurred only five days later, when Kathryn Froggatt left the band due to pregnancy. She later turned her hand to a new band project, entitled Amberlove. Kathryn was replaced by Connie Renda, however, she subsequently changed her mind, and was subsequently replaced by Missy Heselton. In February 2007, Wheatus joined the UK leg of the Get Happy Tour, along with founders Bowling for Soup and Army of Freshmen and British pop-punk outfit Son of Dork, for a sold out 13 show tour. The tour sparked the departure of Liz Brown, who decided to return to her original line of work in New York. Missy Heselton also took a back step from vocal duties to concentrate on studying.

2008–2012: Pop, Songs & Death
The band began recording new material in October 2007. The material's release was carried over until February 2008, when a video for the song "Real Girl" was released to YouTube. The video was written, directed and filmed by Brendan, with assistance from Heselton and Milligan. On February 3, the band made an announcement claiming that the material they had been recording would be available to purchase in the fourth quarter of 2008. In March 2008, the band performed several tour dates in the United States, and also announced dates for an acoustic performance in the United Kingdom. In October 2008, the band completed a successful tour of the UK, during which some of the new material was showcased in an acoustic form. In November 2008, the band returned to the recording studio to perfect their new material, and thus, set a release date for a six-track EP, entitled Pop, Songs & Death, Vol 1: The Lightning EP. In early 2009, Brendan composed music for motion picture April Showers, a film which deals directly with the Columbine Massacre. On June 1, 2009, The Lightning EP was expected for release; however, it was not available until June 2 due to a series of technical difficulties, including a server crash on their website. In January 2010, Wheatus began a worldwide theater tour, with dates spanning the United States, United Kingdom and Austria. They were supported by nerdcore rapper MC Frontalot. In April 2010, Brown announced via his official Twitter page that Pop, Songs & Death, Vol. 2: The Jupiter EP was scheduled for release in May 2010. However, the released was pushed back to December 23, 2010.

In November 2012, the EPs were released together as the band's fourth studio album, Pop, Songs and Death.

2012–2014: The Valentine LP
Following a re-release of the single "Lemonade", supported by the first of three Lego videos created by Oliver Broadbent, the band released their fifth studio album, The Valentine LP in 2013. The album is described a set of "post-apocalyptic love songs", according to Brown. Brown claimed that he delved into the concept of "reconstituting society, fighting zombies, and trying to maintain some kind of romantic relationship at the same time.", whilst the album's sound is reminiscent of 1970s-era The Who, Rush and AC/DC.

An album sampler was released on YouTube on July 27, 2013, while full tracks from the record were uploaded between August 14 and September 9. The album was released on August 2, 2013 as digital download (mp3 and FLAC) through the band's website, with a vinyl version shipping in late 2013. The digital version of the album includes a PDF entitled "Valentine Comic", with concept art for the album, depicting a zombie apocalypse love story. The concept art was designed by graphic artist Ecol (Eric Collins). In September and October 2013, the band toured the album in the UK. Prior to the tour, long-term drummer Kevin Garcia left the band. He was replaced by William Tully.

Following the album's release, the band recorded a new single, "Only You", a collaboration with two members of One Direction's band, bassist Sandy Beales and drummer Josh Devine. The single was released on July 6, 2014. The collaboration came about as a result of One Direction covering "Teenage Dirtbag" on their Where We Are Tour. The album was later released on CD through Blacktop Records in the UK in 2014, with three bonus tracks: "Only You", a single mix of "Holiday" and an acoustic version of "Only You".

2014–2018: Sixth studio album
Since 2014, the band have been in the process of recording a sixth studio album. Tentatively titled Beasts of the Unknown, Brown has stated that the direction of the album will be "80's metal" and will be inspired by the bands that he grew up listening to as a teenager. The first track to feature on the album, "Zelda", first appeared in the band's live setlist in late 2014. Recording was due to take place in late 2015, until plans for a tour celebrating the fifteenth anniversary of their debut album were announced. During this time, William Tully left the band and was replaced on drums by Leo Freiré. Joey Slater also replaced Karlie Bruce after she left the band for a second time. The band then toured with Busted on their Pigs Can Fly arena tour. Brown then stated that recording will continue following the tour's completion.

In late 2016, Brown stated in an interview; "Album [seven] is almost ready to be recorded and we'll be working on that over the winter and hope to have that done by 2017." Brown also stated that twenty songs had been written for the release, and the band were aiming to record them all before the start of the year. "Tipsy" was released as the album's lead single on 22 December 2016. After announcing a further UK tour for April and May 2017, Brown announced that recording had once again halted. During this time, keyboardist Mark Palmer also left the band, with Brandon Ticer brought in as his replacement. Karlie Bruce also returned on backing vocals after a three-year absence, joining Gabrielle Sterbenz and Joey Slater. On June 8, 2018, "Lullaby" was released as the album's second single. A further new song, "Michelle", was first performed live in September 2018 and has often erroneously been referred to by Brown as the band's "new single" ever since, despite it not yet being released.

2018–present: Touring & classic line-up reunion
In November 2018, the band returned to the UK to tour as a support act for A on a fifteenth anniversary tour in support of their album Hi-Fi Serious. In early 2019, the band provided direct support to Mike Doughty on the first leg of his twenty-fifth anniversary tour of Soul Coughing's Ruby Vroom, their first full USA tour in many years. For these shows, Leo Freire was replaced by drummer Madden Klass. Brown, Milligan & Klass also acted as members of Doughty's band for the duration of the tour.

In early 2019, the band announced plans for their first world tour since 2000, playing in the United States and South Africa, as well as 48 dates across Germany, the Netherlands & the United Kingdom. On April 5, 2019, the band played a special show at the Mercury Lounge in New York, which featured two sets: one from the current line-up, and one from the "classic" lineup, with Peter Brown, Mike McCabe, Phil Jimenez, Liz Brown & Kathryn Froggatt performing together for the first time since 2003. During the Welsh dates of the band's world tour, Brown expressed support for Scottish and Welsh independence from the United Kingdom, showing up at a 'Yes' rally march.

As well as continuing to record their sixth album, Brown has stated that the band are in the midst of preparing a 20th anniversary expanded edition of their self-titled debut album, due out in 2020 alongside a 20th anniversary tour.

Brown was featured on the title track of the Math the Band album, Flange Factory Five, released October 2, 2020.

Members

Current
 Brendan B. Brown – lead vocals, guitars (1995–present)
 Matthew Milligan – bass, electric upright bass (2006–present)
 Gabrielle Aimée Sterbenz – backing vocals (2011–present)
 Leo Freire – drums (2015–present)
 Joey Slater – backing vocals (2015–present)
 Brandon Ticer – keyboards (2017–present)

Former

Drums
 Peter McCarrick Brown (also backing vocals, turntables & samples) (1995–2006)
 Kevin Joaquin Garcia (2006–2013)
 James Williams (touring replacement for Kevin Garcia) (2011)
 Ben D Johnson, CCA (2012)
 William Tully (2013–2014)
 Madden Klass – drums (touring replacement for Leo Freire) (2019)

Keyboards
 Philip A. Jimenez (also percussion, samples, turntables, harmonica, banjo, special effects, multiple other instruments) (1995–2003)
 Shannon Patrick Harris (2002–2004)
 Michael Bellar (2004–2005)
 Gerard Charles Hoffmann (2005–2011)
 Ken Flagg (2011)
 Mark Palmer (2011–2016)

Bass
 Rich Liegey (also vocals) (1995–2000)
 Mike Joseph McCabe (also backing vocals) (2000–2005)
 Nicolas DiPierro (2005–2006)

Backing Vocals
 Elizabeth Grace Brown (2002–2007, 2014)
 Kathryn Elizabeth Froggatt (2002–2006)
 Vanessa Jimenez (2003)
 Melissa "Missy" Heselton (2006–2007)
 Constance Renda (2006)
 Johanna Cranitch (2007–2011)
 Georgia Haege (2007–2008)
 Dani Elliott (2011)
 Delaney Gibson (2011)
 Karlie Bruce (2012–2014, 2017–2019)

Timeline

Discography

Wheatus (2000)
Hand Over Your Loved Ones (2003)
Too Soon Monsoon (2005)
Pop, Songs & Death (2012)
The Valentine LP (2013)

References

External links
Official Wheatus website

Musical groups from Long Island
Musical groups established in 1995
Columbia Records artists
1995 establishments in New York (state)
Alternative rock groups from New York (state)